Blonde Bombshell is a 2010 humorous science fiction novel by British writer Tom Holt.

Summary
A race of dogs on another planet decides to destroy Earth because humans were playing their music too loud.

Reception
Philip Cu-Unjieng of The Philippine Star states that with this novel, the writer "reinforces his status as one of the more off-beat, entertaining, comedic writers around."
The Independent says it is "A fun, undemanding read which will put you in touch with your inner adolescent."

References

External links
Author's website

British comedy novels
2010 British novels
Novels by Tom Holt
Orbit Books books